The 1910 NHA season was the first season of the National Hockey Association men's professional ice hockey league. The season started on January 5, but was suspended immediately and the league then absorbed the Ottawa and Shamrocks teams of the Canadian Hockey Association and the season continued from January 15 to March 15. Seven teams played 12 games each. The Ottawa Hockey Club played two Stanley Cup challenges during the season, but lost the Cup to their rivals the Montreal Wanderers who won the league championship and played a Cup challenge afterwards.

League business

After the Canadian Hockey Association (CHA) turned down the Wanderers' application to join, Wanderers' manager Jimmy Gardner, along with Renfrew's Ambrose O'Brien worked to put together enough teams to form a league. Gardner approached the Ottawa Senators of the Federal League to have an Ottawa entry, but the players decided to fold the team, rather than compete with the Ottawa Hockey Club. Gardner also approached the Mutual Street Rink of Toronto to form a professional team, but was turned down as the rink was fully booked.

The league was founded on December 2, 1909, at a private meeting at 300 St. James Street, the headquarters of the Dominion Office and Store Fitting Limited in Montreal, Quebec, Canada. At this meeting four franchises were approved:

 Wanderers (represented by P. J. Doran, R. R. Boon, Jimmy Gardner)
 Renfrew (represented by Ambrose O'Brien, George E. Martel, Jim Barnett)
 Cobalt (Thomas C. Hare)
 Haileybury (Noah Timmins)

Eddie McCafferty acted as secretary, and he also was representative of interests in Toronto. A franchise would be held for a future Toronto team. The NHA discussed organizing a team in Ottawa with the Ottawa Lacrosse Club and getting Montreal Le National to join the NHA. The Wanderers and Renfrew signed a pact not to merge with the CHA unless Cobalt and Haileybury were also admitted. The teams pledged a $1,000 bond to stay together.

Two days later on December 4, the NHA held an organizing meeting at the Windsor Hotel in Montreal. The CHA was meeting at the hotel also, and a message was sent to the Ottawa, Shamrocks and Le National teams to seek a merged seven-team league. This was turned down by the CHA, which would not accept Cobalt and Haileybury. The CHA proposed that Renfrew and Wanderers join the CHA, but the NHA teams turned that proposal down.

An executive was elected:
 President – M. Doheney, Renfrew
 Vice-President – Thomas C. Hare, Cobalt
 Sec.-Treasurer – E. John McCafferty
 Executive – J. Ambrose O'Brien, Slaght, Boon, Jack Laviolette and Thomas C. Hare

At the meeting, a franchise for 'Les Canadiens' was granted, to be organized by Jack Laviolette. Mr. Hare of Cobalt put up a security deposit for the franchise on the understanding that it would be transferred to Montreal French sportsmen as soon as possible.

The NHA decided to run the league in a more business-like manner. The league decided to write a standard player's contract. McCafferty, who was also secretary of the Montreal Baseball Club, was to draw up the contract. The NHA also decided to have professional referees. Both of these were innovations in the world of ice hockey.

Regular season

The first Canadiens game ever took place on January 5 under a cloud. Didier Pitre had signed a contract with both the Canadiens and the Nationals. Pitre was risking a $2,000 fine and 60 days jail time. The Nationals had a legal injunction against Pitre playing for the Canadiens. This contributed to an over-capacity crowd at the Jubilee Rink of about 5,000. Pitre did play (he was guaranteed any fines by Canadiens' management) and court action commenced. Pitre was found to not to have a binding contract with the Nationals by the courts. By this time, the CHA had folded, and no contract was enforceable. Pitre would have a long career with the Canadiens, playing into the 1920s.

On January 15, a meeting was held by the league executive and Ottawa and Montreal Shamrocks were admitted to the NHA. The games played before that date were thrown out, and games from that date forwards counted towards the final standings.

On January 22, at a game between Renfrew and Shamrocks, Shamrock's Joe Hall was ejected for striking the judge-of-play Rod Kennedy. After regulation time, the game was tied. Referee Tom Hodge proposed that Hall return for the overtime, but Renfrew objected and did not play the overtime. Hall was later fined $100 for the incident and suspended until January 30. The game was ordered replayed but wasn't due to ice conditions and the game results were accepted as a tie.

On Cyclone Taylor's first return to Ottawa as a member of the Renfrew team, he made his famous promise to score a goal backwards against Ottawa. This led to incredible interest, with over 7000 in attendance. A bet of $100 was placed at the King Edward Hotel against him scoring at all. The Senators would win 8–5 (3 goals in overtime) and more importantly keep Taylor off the scoresheet. Later in the season at the return match in Renfrew, Taylor made good on his boast with a goal scored backwards. This was the final game of the season, and the Senators had no chance at the league title, and don't appear to have put in an effort, losing 17–2.

Final standings

Stanley Cup challenges

During the season, Ottawa, as Cup champion, played a challenge against Edmonton Hockey Club in addition to their regular schedule. They had played a challenge during the CHA season against Galt.

Ottawa vs. Edmonton

Edmonton was champion of the Alberta Amateur Hockey Association.

NHA league champions take over Stanley Cup

The Wanderers won the championship of the NHA and took possession of the Stanley Cup from Ottawa. They had a challenge from Berlin, champions of the Ontario Professional Hockey League and easily defeated them. For 1910, there would be two Stanley Cup holders, Ottawa which held and defended it until March, and Montreal for the rest of the year.

Wanderers vs. Berlin

NHA exhibitions at New York
After the season, the NHA arranged an 'international championship' at New  York City's St. Nicholas Rink. Like the previous spring, Ottawa and Wanderers played a two-game series in New York for a purse of $1,500. Wanderers won both games 4–3. Renfrew next travelled to New York and defeated the Wanderers in a single game for $1,000.

Source

Schedule and results

† Games played before January 15, which were played before the CHA teams joined
were not counted against the final standings.

‡ The January 22 game was abandoned due to an on-ice incident. It was ordered replayed on March 2 in Ottawa, but wasn't played due to soft ice in Ottawa.

Player statistics

Goaltending averages
Note: GP = Games played, GA = Goals against, SO = Shutouts, GAA = Goals against average

Scoring leaders

Stanley Cup engraving
The 1910 Stanley Cup was presented by the trophy's trustee William Foran. The Wanderers never did engrave their names on the Cup for their championship season.

The following Wanderers players and staff were members of the Stanley Cup winning team.

1910 Montreal Wanderers

See also
 Canadian Hockey Association
 List of pre-NHL seasons
 1909 in sports
 1910 in sports
 List of Stanley Cup champions

References

Bibliography

Notes

External links
 NHA history from the Edmonton Oilers website

 
1909–10 in Canadian ice hockey by league
National Hockey Association seasons